Bolívar is a province in Ecuador. The capital is Guaranda.  Much of the province has a cool, 'sierra' climate, as it is located in the Andes Mountains. The area in the lower foothills has a cold, tundra-like climate.

Cantons
The province is divided into seven cantons. The following table lists each with its population as of the 2010 census, its area in square kilometres (km2), and the name of the canton seat or capital.

Demographics
Ethnic groups as of the Ecuadorian census of 2010:
Mestizo  69.6%
Indigenous  25.4%
White  2.7%
Montubio  1.1%
Afro-Ecuadorian  1.1%
Other  0.1%

Politics
Results of the Ecuadorian presidential elections of 2013 in Bolívar Province:
Rafael Correa  (PAIS)  33.7%
Guillermo Lasso  (CREO)  27.7%
Lucio Gutiérrez (PSP)  25.4%
Mauricio Rodas (SUMA)  4.9%
Alberto Acosta (UPI)  4.2%
Álvaro Noboa  (PRIAN)  2.4%
Norman Wray (Ruptura 25)  1.0%
Nelson Zavala (PRE)  0.8%

See also 
 Provinces of Ecuador
 Cantons of Ecuador

References

External links 
 Community Ecotourism in Bolívar
 Eco-Friendly Farmstays in Bolívar

 
Provinces of Ecuador